Jude Anthony Cole (born June 18, 1960) is an American singer, songwriter, manager, and record producer. After signing to Reprise Records, Cole's solo career began with his eponymous debut studio album in 1987, which was followed up with 4 subsequent releases until 2000. From then, he outsourced his talent onto managing, producing, and co-writing for the band Lifehouse, whom Cole took under his wing. He is the co-founder of the Ironworks music label alongside actor Kiefer Sutherland.

Career
After spending two years as guitarist and backing vocalist for Moon Martin and The Ravens (Capitol Records), Cole joined UK-based band The Records for the Crashes album in 1980. However, Cole remained in the US when the band returned to Britain to pursue his career as a solo artist. His first three solo records, Jude Cole (1987), A View from 3rd Street (1990) and Start the Car (1992) were released on Reprise Records and contained the singles "Baby, It's Tonight", "Time for Letting Go", "Compared To Nothing" and "Start the Car". His fourth album, I Don't Know Why I Act This Way, was released by Island Records in 1995, Falling Home on his own Watertown Records in 2000, and most recent an EP titled In Plain Sight on his own Ironworks label.

Cole is the manager, producer and co-writer of the alternative rock band Lifehouse, and has co-written the last four consecutive singles with Jason Wade.

In 2000, Cole walked away from his artist career to manage Lifehouse (DreamWorks) and Lindsay Pagano (Warner Bros).  He chose Irving Azoff as a partner and spent the next 4 years with Azoff Management.

In 2003, Cole and business partner, actor Kiefer Sutherland formed Ironworks Studio and Ironworks Records, signing acts like Billy Boy on Poison, Ron Sexsmith, and honeyhoney.

In 2005, Cole contributed segments to the entertainment television program Extra as music critic, interviewing artists like The Rolling Stones, Alice Cooper, Bob Seger and others.

Cole also wrote the musical score for three films.

In 2019, Cole wrote, produced and engineered a record for Kiefer Sutherland but aside from production was not credited.
The album starts with Cole's "Open Road" from his 1992 album, Start the Car.

On January 20, 2021, Cole released the album Coup De Main, his first new album in over 20 years. The album consists of nine tracks and was made available on all streaming platforms. He later released a cover album, Coolerator, on July 27, 2021.

Personal life
Cole was married to Lori Pfeiffer (born 1965), the younger sister of actress Michelle Pfeiffer, with whom he has two sons.

Discography

Albums
Jude Cole (1987)
A View from 3rd Street (1990)
Start the Car (1992)
I Don't Know Why I Act This Way (1995)
Falling Home (2000)
Coup De Main (2021)
Coolerator (2021)

Singles

Musical credits

Moon Martin – Escape from Domination 1979 – guitar, background vocals (Capitol)
Moon Martin – Street Fever 1980 – guitar, background vocals, songwriter (Capitol)
The Records – Crashes 1980 – co-lead singer, lead guitarist (Virgin)
Moon Martin – Mystery Ticket 1981 – songwriter (Capitol)
Peter Noone – Solo Record 1981 – background vocals, guitar (Pasha/Columbia)
Billy Thorpe – East of Eden's Gate 1982 – background vocals (Pasha)
Dave Edmunds – D.E. 7th 1982 – songwriter (Columbia)
Ted Nugent – Ted Nugent 1982 – background vocals (Epic)
Patrick Simmons – Arcade 1983 – guitar (Electra)
Del Shannon – Drop Down and Get Me 1983 – background vocals, guitar (London)
Soundtrack – Where the Boys Are '84 1984 – songwriter, artist (MCA)
Soundtrack – Back to School 1986 – artist (MCA)
Jude Cole (self-titled) 1987 (Warner Bros)
Soundtrack – Karate Kid III 1988 – songwriter, artist
Lisa Hartman – Till My Heart Stops 1988 – songwriter (Atlantic)
Jude Cole – A View from 3rd Street 1990 (Reprise)
Jude Cole – Start the Car 1992 (Reprise)
Marc Bonilla – American Matador 1993 – songwriter (Reprise)
Jude Cole – I Don't Know Why I Act This Way 1995 (Island)
Paola Turci – Oltre Le Nuvole (1997) producer, guitar, background vocals (Warner Bros. Italy)
Soundtrack – Truth or Consequences, NM (1998) composer
Jewel – Spirit 1998 – guitars, background vocals (Atlantic)
Travis Tritt – No More Looking over My Shoulder 1998 – guitar, songwriter (Warner Bros)
Billie Myers – Vertigo 1999 – guitar
Kendall Payne – Jordan's Sister 1999 – guitar, background vocals (Capitol)
Clay Davidson – Unconditional 2000 – producer, guitar, background vocals (Virgin Nashville)
Jude Cole – Falling Home 2000 (Watertown)
Lifehouse – No Name Face 2000 – manager, songwriter (DreamWorks)
Lindsay Pagano – Love & Faith & Inspiration 2001 – manager, songwriter, producer, musician (Warner Brothers)
Lifehouse – Stanley Climbfall 2002 – manager (DreamWorks)
Styx – Cyclorama 2003 – background vocals (Sanctuary)
Soundtrack, Beth Orton – Warchild 2003 – producer (Astralwerks)
Soundtrack, Beth Orton – How to Deal 2004 – producer (Capitol)
Lifehouse – Lifehouse 2005 – manager, songwriter (Geffen)
Mozella – I Will 2006 – producer, songwriter, musician (Maverick)
Rocco Deluca & The Burden – I Trust You to Kill Me 2006 – manager, producer, songwriter (Ironworks)
Leigh Nash – Blue on Blue 2006 – songwriter
Lifehouse – Who We Are 2007 – manager, producer, songwriter, musician (Interscope/Geffen)
honeyhoney – Loose Boots (EP) 2008 – producer (Ironworks)
honeyhoney – First Rodeo 2009 – producer (Ironworks/Universal Republic)
Jim Stapley – Love Is Surrender (EP) 2010 – producer, songwriter, musician (Ironworks)
Lifehouse – Smoke & Mirrors 2010 – manager, co-producer, songwriter, musician (Interscope/Geffen)
Rhett Miller – The Dreamer 2012 – songwriter "I'll Try To"
Lifehouse – Almería 2013 – manager, co-producer, songwriter, musician (Interscope/Geffen)
One Ok Rock – 35xxxv 2014 – producer, co-writer of song "Fight The Night"
Lifehouse – "Hurricane" 2014 – producer, co-writer of first single from forthcoming album
Lifehouse – Out of the Wasteland 2015 – producer, cowriter, manager
Kiefer Sutherland – Down in a Hole 2016 – writer, producer, musicians, engineer"
Kiefer Sutherland – Reckless & Me 2019 – writer, producer, musician, engineer"

References

External links

1960 births
Living people
American male singer-songwriters
American rock singers
American rock songwriters
Ironworks (record label) artists
Record producers from Illinois
Singer-songwriters from Illinois
Guitarists from Illinois
American male guitarists